Bilal A. “Bill” Essayli is an American lawyer and politician currently serving in the California State Assembly. A Republican, he represents California's 63rd State Assembly district, which includes Woodcrest, Temescal Valley, Lake Elsinore, and Menifee.

Early life 
Essayli's parents are immigrants from Lebanon who fled to the country to escape its civil war.

Education 
Essayli is the first member of his family to graduate from college.  He received his undergraduate degree from the Kellogg Honors College of California State Polytechnic University, Pomona. He received his Juris Doctor degree from Chapman University School of Law.

Career 
Essayli served as an intern in the White House Counsel's Office in 2008.  He then worked in private practice, where he focused on employment law.  Then he joined the Riverside County District Attorney's office as a prosecutor.  He then became an Assistant United States Attorney for the Central District of California.  Among the cases he worked on was the 2015 terrorist attack in San Bernardino.

Political campaigns 
In 2018, Essayli ran for the California State Assembly against incumbent Democrat Sabrina Cervantes.  He lost the election, but made a strong showing, which raised his local profile.

In 2022, Essayli ran for the state Assembly in the newly created 63rd Assembly District.  He defeated Eastvale Mayor Clint Lorimore in the primary and businesswoman Fauzia Rizvi in the general election.

Personal life 
Essayli is the first Muslim in history to be elected to the California State Assembly.

References

External links 
 Official website
 Campaign website
 Bill Essayli on Ballotpedia

Living people
21st-century American politicians
Republican Party members of the California State Assembly
Chapman University alumni
Year of birth missing (living people)